Gjertsen Promontory is a low but sharply rising promontory at the extremity of the spur trending north from Mount Gjertsen, in the La Gorce Mountains of Antarctica. The feature was mapped by the United States Geological Survey from surveys and U.S. Navy air photos, 1960–64, and was named by the New Zealand Geological Survey Antarctic Expedition, 1969–70, in association with Mount Gjertsen.

References

Landforms of Marie Byrd Land
Promontories of Antarctica